Usd al-ghabah fi marifat al-Saḥabah, commonly known as Usa al-Gabah, is a book by scholar Ali ibn al-Athir. Written in 1200 and published in 2012, it is a biographical work of Prophet Muhammad and 7,554 of his companions.

Structure 
The accounts are ordered alphabetically. The title relies primarily on four other works: Ma'rifat al-Sahabah by Abi Na'im, al-Isti'ab fi Ma'rifat al-Ashab by Ibn 'Abd al-Barr, Ma'rifat al-Ashab and al-Dhayl 'ala Ma'rifat al-Ashab, both by Ibn Mandah.

Ibn Hajar notes in Taqrib; he was truthful, but habitually connected disjointed narrations without mentioning his sources.

References 

12th-century books
Sunni literature
Hadith
Hadith collections
Books of Rijal